What Men Want is a 2019 American fantasy comedy film. It may also refer to:

Films
 What Men Want (1930 film), an American drama film directed by Ernst Laemmle 
 Po čem muži touží (translated as What Men Want), a 2018 Czech comedy film

Other
What Men Want, a Malaysian TV show which aired on NTV7 and winner of "Best Reality Programme" in the 2012 Asian Television Awards
 What Men Want, a one-man comedy show by Peadar de Burca
What Men Want, a book of poems by Laura McCullough
What Men Want: In Bed, a book by Bettina Arndt

See also
What a Man Wants, a 2018 South Korean film
What Women Want (disambiguation)